7 April Stadium is a multipurpose stadium in the Syrian city of Qamishli. It is mostly used for football matches and is home to the Syrian 1st Division football club Al-Jihad SC. It has a capacity of 10,000 spectators.

See also
List of football stadiums in Syria

7 April Qamishli